Richard G. Frank is an American healthcare economist and academic working as the Margaret T. Morris Professor of Health Economics in the Department of Health Care Policy at Harvard Medical School. Frank had previously served as assistant secretary of health and human services for planning and evaluation from 2014 to 2016.

Education 
Frank earned a Bachelor of Arts in Economics from Bard College and a PhD in Economics from Boston University.

Career 
Prior to assuming his position at Harvard Medical School, Frank served as the deputy assistant secretary for planning and evaluation at the United States Department of Health and Human Services, responsible for managing the Office of Disability, Aging and Long-Term Care Policy. From 2013 to 2014, Frank served as a Special Advisor to the Secretary of Health and Human Services, Kathleen Sebelius. He was appointed to serve as Assistant Secretary of Health and Human Services for Planning and Evaluation in 2014, succeeding Sherry Glied. He also worked as the editor of the Journal of Health Economics from 2005 to 2014.

References 

Health economists
United States Department of Health and Human Services officials
Bard College alumni
Morrissey College of Arts & Sciences alumni
Harvard Medical School faculty
Living people
Year of birth missing (living people)
Obama administration personnel